Yves Van Massenhove (26 February 1909 – 15 May 1990) was a Belgian cyclist. He competed in the team pursuit and sprint events at the 1928 Summer Olympics.

References

External links
 

1909 births
1990 deaths
Belgian male cyclists
Olympic cyclists of Belgium
Cyclists at the 1928 Summer Olympics
People from Saint-Josse-ten-Noode
Cyclists from Brussels